Cnaphalocrocis medinalis, the rice leafroller, is a species of moth of the family Crambidae. It is found in south-east Asia, including Hong Kong, Sri Lanka, Taiwan, Thailand and most of Australia.

The larvae are considered a pest of Oryza sativa, Zea mays, and Triticum, Saccharum and Sorghum species.

The moth is very active, bright yellow or straw in colour with two distinct wavy lines in the fore wing and one wavy distinct line in the hind wing. Eggs are laid singularly or in groups arranged in longitudinal rows on the undersurface of the leaves which are scaly white in color. Fecundity is about 56 eggs. Incubation period is 4–8 days. We find 5–6 larval instars, larval period is about 22–23 days. It pupates with in the infested leaf fold for a period of 6–7 days. The total life cycle completed in about 5 weeks.

All the stages of the crop are attacked by this pest. On hatching the newly hatched caterpillar cut the leaf edges and folds the leaf. When young seedlings are attacked it folds 3–4 adjacent plant leaves and scrapes the green matter so that the infested leaves appear white. A single caterpillar damages several leaves. The attacked plants dry up and it reduces the vigour of the plant. Ultimately the yield gets reduced. The yield loss may vary up to 10–50 per cent. It is more problematic at boot leaf stage.

Feature Description 

They have a brown head, the thorax and abdomen are green at first, then become yellowish-green, and reddish brown when they are mature. There are two spiral-shaped black lines at the posterior margin of the tergum of the front thorax and 8 distinct small black circles at the tergum of the middle and posterior thorax, among which there were six leading edges and two trailing edges.

The central part of the leading edge of the male moth's proala has a shining and concave eyespot, while the female moth's proala has no eyespot.

Pest Impact 
Rice leafrollers are harmful at the stage of larva. Generally, the 1st-instar larva crawled into the heart leaf or the leaf sheath nearby, and the 2nd-instar larva began to spin silk at the leaf tip, and then began to turn into a small insect bud after the 3rd-instar. The food intake at 4th and 5th instar, which accounting for more than 90% of the total food intake of the larva. Although, there are some differences between different generations.

Rice (Oryza sativa L.) is the most important staple food for more than half of the world population including India. Insect pests inflict an average of 21%–51% yield loss in rice, which leads to one of the major reasons for poorer crop productivity in India. The leaf folder infestation may cause more than 50% of leaf damage with significant yield losses.

Methods of pest control

Cultural Control 
Reform the tillage system and cultivation system, rational fertilization, avoid the early growth of rice, late ripening. Also, the damage of rice leaf roller could be reduced by avoiding early, middle and late rice mixed cropping. It is also possible to reduce the damage of pests through variety layout, setting up trapping and killing fields and reducing application area. It is also possible to harvest early rice according to the growth rate of the leaf roller, and then kill some larvae and pupae in deep water, so as to reduce the birth rate of the next generation.

Physical and Mechanical Control 
Because rice leaf roller has phototaxis, it has a strong tendency to approach metal halogen lamps, and farmers can use light to lure and kill pests. Lure insect lamp has the advantage of quick, effective, and simple operation. It rarely requires medicament, and does not cause environmental pollution.

Biological Control 
Application of chemical pesticide results in drag resistance and re-occurrence of the pests, and also kills natural predators of the pests. However, natural predators can effectively control the pest. It is estimated that there are more than 130 natural predators of rice leaf roller. Therefore, the protection and utilization of natural predators is very important to improve the sustainability of rice pest management.

Chemical Control 
Bt crops are effective. According to different generations, the use of pesticides should be reasonably arranged and used alternately to prevent the resistance of rice leaf roller.

References

External links
 Australian Caterpillars

Spilomelinae
Moths of Japan
Moths described in 1854
Insect pests of millets